Claude Bertin (died 1705) was a French sculptor, who was part of the highly trained team that supplied sculptures for Versailles. His monumental marble vases, following the type of the Borghese Vase, with rich bas-reliefs of fruit, swags of ivy or friezes of mythological scenes, executed between 1687 and 1705, still adorn the terraces of Versailles.

External links
Château de Versailles:  Les oeuvres à restaurer en 2006 Three vases by Bertin.

17th-century French sculptors
French male sculptors
18th-century French sculptors
1705 deaths
Year of birth unknown
18th-century French male artists